Davis is a station on the Chicago Transit Authority's 'L' system, on the Purple Line in Evanston, Illinois.  It is located at 1612 Benson Avenue (directional coordinates 1600 north, 800 west), in the middle of downtown Evanston, and next to the Davis Street stop of Metra's Union Pacific/North Line.  The station is also a terminus for one CTA and two Pace bus routes. The station is referred to as the Davis Transit Center by Pace.

History

Structure

The current station was reconstructed from 1992 until 1994, and is made out of brick and concrete with a spacious metal and glass train shed, but lacks the styling or decoration found in many other CTA stations, giving Davis a modern urban, if utilitarian, feel.  The station sports two prominent clock towers, on the west and east sides.  It has several different paintings hanging in various areas of the platform.  It also has a light board system, as well as a speaker system to alert passengers of train delays.  There is a Dunkin' Donuts on the lower level, near the fare card vending machines.  The platform, like most elevated CTA platforms, has a problem with pigeons.  To combat the dropping issue, the CTA installed a fishnet over the entire station.  While the fishnet has stopped pigeons from the area over the rails, there are a few signs, toward the back of the platforms, that have spikes, which does not work that often.

Platform signage
Davis is one of the four test sites for the Active Transit Station Signs (ATSS) program. In September 2002, the signs were installed at the station. The signs display preprogrammed and service-related messages as well as a countdown until the next train; however, the Davis station's signs do not display the countdown feature due to a programming glitch.

Transportation

Bus

CTA
  93 California/Dodge (Monday–Saturday only) 
  201 Central/Ridge (Monday–Saturday only) 
  206 Evanston Circulator (school days only) 

Pace
  208 Golf Road 
  213 Green Bay Road (Monday–Saturday only) 
  250 Dempster Street 

Rail

Metra
Evanston Davis Street (Metra)

Notes and references

Notes

References

External links 

 Train schedule (PDF) at CTA official site
 Davis Street Station Page at Chicago-L.org
 Davis Station Page CTA official site

CTA Purple Line stations
Railway stations in Evanston, Illinois
Railway stations in the United States opened in 1908
1908 establishments in Illinois